Grigor Dimitrov was the defending champion, but lost to Ryan Harrison in the second round.

David Ferrer won the title, defeating Kei Nishikori in the final, 6–3, 7–5.

Seeds

Draw

Finals

Top half

Bottom half

Qualifying

Seeds

 Tim Smyczek (first round)
 Lukáš Lacko (first round)
 Alejandro González (qualified)
 Aljaž Bedene (qualifying competition)
 Alejandro Falla (qualifying competition)
 Gastão Elias (first round)
 Jimmy Wang (qualifying competition)
 Adrián Menéndez-Maceiras (first round)

Qualifiers

Qualifying draw

First qualifier

Second qualifier

Third qualifier

Fourth qualifier

References
Main Draw
Qualifying Draw

2015 Abierto Mexicano Telcel